Baloch people in the United Arab Emirates comprise residents of the United Arab Emirates whose ancestral roots lie in Balochistan. The Baloch are one of the oldest migrant groups in the country.

History
Outside Balochistan, the largest Baloch diaspora communities reside in the Persian Gulf region, particularly Oman and the UAE. Many of the Baloch have been settled in the region before the formation of Pakistan and the UAE, forming part of the local Bedoon community. The Balochistan region lies on the Iranian plateau, located across the Persian Gulf. Due to the proximity between both regions, Baloch settlers have been in contact with the Persian Gulf since centuries. The Baloch are mentioned in Arabic chronicles dating back to the 10th century. The majority of Baloch migrants originate from the southern Makran coast.

Baloch who resided in the Trucial States prior to 1925 or before the formation of the union were offered the Emirati citizenship as per Article 17 of the United Arab Emirates Citizenship and Passport Law of Year 1972.

Demographics
The number of Baloch in the UAE is estimated to be anywhere from 215,000 to 468,000. The population has grown since 2006 when it was around 100,000. A number of Baloch serve in the UAE's armed forces. 

The Baloch are divided into numerous tribes. These tribal networks extend into typically large connected families. One Baloch-Emirati man, Daad Mohammed Al Balushi, has 93 children and ranks among the world's list of people with the most children.

Culture
The Baloch speak Balochi. The Gulf dialect of Arabic is also natively spoken by those who have been settled in the region for generations.  A Balochi literary society under the name Balochi Labzanki Sarchammag is active in the UAE. In Balochi folklore, the Gulf is frequently referenced as a land of opportunities and employment. Poetry, lullabies or songs sung by women at weddings for instance contain references to the economic prosperity offered in Dubai. The surname Al Balushi denotes Baloch ancestry and is widely used among the local Baloch. Some Baloch speak Persian and Urdu as languages from countries such as Iran and Pakistan.

See also

 Baloch diaspora
Shihuh
 Pakistanis in the United Arab Emirates
 Iranians in the United Arab Emirates
 Al Balushi

References

 
United Arab Emirates
Ethnic groups in the United Arab Emirates
Pakistani diaspora in the United Arab Emirates
Iranian diaspora in the United Arab Emirates